Dwijdeo Mishra was the first king of the Mishra dynasty of the Ayodhya, the last royal rulers of Ayodhya. Mishra empire that lasted for about a century was able to hold on to the concept of Ram Rajya. The empire soon collapsed because of weakening economic crises that arose due to climatic conditions.

References

People from Faizabad district
Year of birth missing
Year of death missing